Semaeopus vincentii is a moth of the family Geometridae first described by Louis Beethoven Prout in 1938. It is found on the Lesser Antilles.

Subspecies
Semaeopus vincentii vincentii (St. Vincent, Bequia)
Semaeopus vincentii luciae Prout, 1938 (St. Lucia)

References

Moths described in 1938
Cosymbiini